The 1924 Milan–San Remo was the 17th edition of the Milan–San Remo cycle race and was held on 16 March 1924. The race started in Milan and finished in San Remo. The race was won by Pietro Linari of the Legnano–Pirelli team.

General classification

References

1924
1924 in road cycling
1924 in Italian sport
March 1924 sports events